Harris Hall is an auditorium located at 617 East Huron Street in Ann Arbor, Michigan. It was listed on the National Register of Historic Places in 1982.

History
The Reverend Samuel Smith Harris was the second Bishop of the Episcopal Diocese of Michigan. During the late 1800s, in response to the controversy surrounding the then-new theory of evolution, Harris had the idea of constructing a forum for discussions of religion and science. Ann Arbor, the location of the University of Michigan, was Harris's selection for a location. In 1883, Harris and the local parish, St. Andrew's, began raising funds to construct a building. The church hired Detroit architect Gordon W. Lloyd to design this auditorium. Construction began in 1886 and was complete in 1887.

The building was originally named Hobart Hall in honor of former bishop John Henry Hobart, but was renamed after Harris's unexpected death in 1888. The hall was used for lectures, concerts, and other cultural forms of entertainment. The hall served the Episcopal church (it included parish house facilities) and University students, as well as the community at large. In addition to the auditorium, the building also contained a gymnasium, bowling alley, and billiard room. The building continued to be used for its original purpose until 1943, when it was converted to a USO for servicemen undergoing military training at the University. Beginning in 1946, the University leased it to use as headquarters for the Band and Wind Instrument departments. In 1974, St. Andrew's sold the structure to the non-denominational Word of God Community. In 1980, the firm of Buckheim and Rowland acquired the building and converted it to use as offices.

Description
It sits on a random-ashlar foundation, and has yellow-gray stone trim as string courses, doorway and window sills and lintels, and drip moldings. It has wooden Queen Anne-style eavesboards with supporting brackets. Above the entry and first floor windows are recessed, arch-topped, spandrel panels containing red terra cotta. Similar panels in the second story contain colored glass transom lights. A flight of limestone steps runs up to the main entrance, which is protected by a projecting, gable-roofed structure with rounded flanking walls and carved stone capitals similar to Romanesque columns.

References

National Register of Historic Places in Washtenaw County, Michigan
Victorian architecture in Michigan
Buildings and structures completed in 1886
Buildings and structures in Ann Arbor, Michigan